Laetitia Kimalou Bambara (born 30 March 1984 in Bordeaux, France) is a French-born hammer thrower representing Burkina Faso. She won several medals on continental medal in addition to finishing fourth at the 2007 Summer Universiade.

Her personal best in the event is 68.59 metres (Sotteville-lès-Rouen, June 2016) is the current Burkinabé record and all time 2nd best in Africa.

Competition record

References

External links
 
 Profil de Laetitia Bambara sur le site de la FFA

1984 births
Living people
Citizens of Burkina Faso through descent
Burkinabé hammer throwers
Sportspeople from Bordeaux
French female hammer throwers
Burkinabé female athletes
Athletes (track and field) at the 2015 African Games
African Games gold medalists for Burkina Faso
African Games medalists in athletics (track and field)
French sportspeople of Burkinabé descent
Sportspeople of Burkinabé descent
Athletes (track and field) at the 2019 African Games
African Games gold medalists in athletics (track and field)
Competitors at the 2007 Summer Universiade
21st-century Burkinabé people